Hey, Rookie is a 1944 American musical film starring Ann Miller and Larry Parks.

Cast
Ann Miller 	... 	Winnie Clark
Joe Besser 	... 	Pendelton (Pudge) Pfeiffer
Larry Parks 	... 	Jim Leighter
Joe Sawyer 	... 	Sergeant
 Jimmy Little 	... 	Bert Pfeiffer
Selmer Jackson ... 	Col. Robbins
 Larry Thompson ... 	Capt. Jessop
Barbara Brown 	... 	Mrs. Clark
Charles Trowbridge	... 	General Willis
Charles C. Wilson 	... 	Sam Jonas
Syd Saylor	... 	Cpl. Trupp
Doodles Weaver	... 	Maxon

Production
"This photoplay is based upon the musical stage production 'Hey, Rookie', as originally presented by the 'Yardbirds of Fort MacArthur'.

Hey Rookie was a traveling Army show during World War II that was written and produced by soldiers stationed at Fort MacArthur. The show raised $250,000 that was used to help fund construction of a swimming pool, which opened in June 1943. The swimming pool was renovated and reopened in 2016.

Notes

External links

Hey Rookie at TCMDB

1944 films
Columbia Pictures films
1940s English-language films
American musical films
1944 musical films
American black-and-white films
Military humor in film
World War II films made in wartime
Films directed by Charles Barton